The following is a list of events affecting American television in 2020. Events listed include television show debuts, finales, and cancellations; channel launches, closures, and re-brandings; stations changing or adding their network affiliations; and information about controversies and carriage disputes.

Notable events

Awards

Television shows

Shows debuting in 2020

Shows changing networks

Milestone episodes and anniversaries

Shows returning in 2020
The following shows returned with new episodes after being canceled or previously ending their run:

Shows ending in 2020

Entering syndication in 2020
A list of programs (current or canceled) that have accumulated enough episodes (between 65 and 100) or seasons (three or more) to be eligible for off-network syndication and/or basic cable runs.

Networks and services

Launches

Conversions and rebrandings

Closures

Television stations

Subchannel launches

Stations changing network affiliation

Major affiliation changes

 This section outlines affiliation changes involving English and Spanish language networks (ABC, NBC, CBS, Fox, PBS, The CW, Univision, etc.), and format conversions involving independent stations. Digital subchannels will only be mentioned if the prior or new affiliation involves a major English and Spanish broadcast network or a locally programmed independent entertainment format.

Subchannel affiliation

Station closures

Deaths

Notes

References

External links 
List of 2020 American television series at IMDb

 
American television in 2020